Sewickley Township was a township located in Allegheny County, Pennsylvania, from 1797 until 1800, and after in Beaver County until the town's extinction in 1801.

History 

Sewickley Township was created in 1797 when Pine township, Allegheny County, was divided by the east line of Breading's District of Depreciation Lands, and the part west of that line was called "Sewickley Township." Sewickley Township, Allegheny County, covered for the most part all that part of Beaver County east of the Big Beaver. As one of the original townships of Beaver County (1800), Sewickley covered the same territory.

While no clear record has been found it appears that in 1801 Sewickley Township was divided into New Sewickley and North Sewickley Townships and it ceased to exist.

References

Former townships in Pennsylvania
1797 establishments in Pennsylvania
1800s disestablishments in Pennsylvania
Townships in Beaver County, Pennsylvania